Picklescott is a village in Shropshire, England.

It is located in the northern foothills of the Long Mynd, approximately 5 kilometres (3 miles) northwest of Church Stretton and 11 kilometres (7 miles) south of Shrewsbury.

Picklescott lies in the parish of Smethcott, now a hamlet to its east. To the south of the village is the hamlet of Betchcott.

There is a public house in Picklescott - the Bottle and Glass - a traditional country pub, which serves local real ales and food, and a Village Hall built in 1967 with additions in 2004.

See also
Listed buildings in Smethcott

References

Villages in Shropshire
Shrewsbury and Atcham